During the 2005–06 season, the Italian football club :Parma F.C. was placed 7th in the :Serie A. The team reached the fourth round of the :Coppa Italia.

Competitions

Serie A

League table

Results

Coppa Italia

Parma lost 1-0 on aggregate.

Squad statistics

Top scorers

Notes

Sources
  RSSSF - Italy 2005/06

Parma Calcio 1913 seasons
Parma